The Balangao tribe inhabits the barangay of Balangao in Natonin, Mountain Province, Philippines.

The Balangao tribe focuses primarily on farming, which is performed either in rice terraces or on lands that were cleared by fire. At present, many of the younger generation of the tribe have gained education and are exposed to modernization, changing the once traditional society of the tribe.

The language of the tribe is also called Balangao. It is confined to the tribe and other nearby tribes who have their own languages related to the Balangao dialect.

References 

Igorot